Czech Republic will compete at the 2022 European Championships in Munich from August 11 to August 22, 2022.

Medallists

Competitors
The following is the list of number of competitors in the Championships:

Athletics

Beach Volleyball

Czech Republic has qualified 2 male pairs.

Gymnastics

Men

Czech Republic has entered one male athlete.

Qualification

Women

Qualification

Rowing

Men

Women

Triathlon

Men

Women

Mixed

References

2022
Nations at the 2022 European Championships
European Championships